Balanbale is a town in the Togdheer region of Somaliland.

See also
Administrative divisions of Somaliland
Regions of Somaliland
Districts of Somaliland
Somalia–Somaliland border

References
Balanballe

Populated places in Togdheer